Nasser al-Rashed (22 July 1992 – May 15, 2013) was a Kuwaiti squash player. 
He was a several-time national champion. He died of a heart attack on May 15, 2013, at the age of 20.

References

1992 births
2013 deaths
Kuwaiti squash players